Aspiviridae, formerly Ophioviridae, is a family of segmented negative-strand RNA viruses which infect plants. Member viruses are characterized by an elongated and highly filamentous and flexible nucleocapsid with helical symmetry.  It is a monotypic taxon containing only one genus, Ophiovirus.  Aspiviridae is also the only family in the order Serpentovirales, which in turn is the only order in the class Milneviricetes.

History 
The name Aspiviridae derives from the Latin  (snake or viper), referring to the shape, along with the suffix for a virus family -viridae. Ophiovirus derives from the Ancient Greek ophis, “snake”, with –virus the suffix for a virus genus. Likewise, Serpentovirales is from "serpent" with -virales the suffix for a virus order. Milneviricetes is in honor of Robert G. Milne, the last author on the first paper describing ophioviruses.

Virology

Structure 
The protein capsid is non-enveloped and has a constant diameter of 1500–2500 nm and a width of 3 nm, or 9 nm. The capsids form kinked circles, which can collapse to form linear duplex structures, much like a spring.

Genome 
Member viruses have segmented, negative-sense, single-stranded RNA genomes. The entire genome is 11000–12000 nucleotides long.

Taxonomy

The family has one genus, Ophiovirus, which has seven recognized species. Members of both the family and the genus are referred to as ophioviruses.

 Family: Aspiviridae
Genus: Ophiovirus
Species:
Blueberry mosaic associated ophiovirus
Citrus psorosis ophiovirus
Freesia sneak ophiovirus
Lettuce ring necrosis ophiovirus
Mirafiori lettuce big-vein ophiovirus
Ranunculus white mottle ophiovirus
Tulip mild mottle mosaic ophiovirus

References

External links
 ICTV Online Report Ophioviridae
 Viralzone: Ophioviridae

 
Virus families